The Wattie's Tournament was a golf tournament held in New Zealand from 1963 to 1970. The event was generally hosted by Hastings Golf Club in Bridge Pā, except the 1969 event which was held at Gisborne. The 1963 tournament was held in September but later it was played in late November or in December. Bob Charles won the event four times. The event was sponsored by Wattie's.

Winners

References

Golf tournaments in New Zealand
Recurring sporting events established in 1963
Recurring events disestablished in 1970
1963 establishments in New Zealand
1970 disestablishments in New Zealand